John Peroutt Taylor (1855 - September 5, 1930), also known as John Pervatt Taylor, was a Democratic Mississippi politician and legislator who was the state treasurer of Mississippi from 1916 to 1920.

Biography 
John Peroutt Taylor was born in the year 1855, in Carroll County, Mississippi. He was the son of Benjamin B. and Elizabeth Frances Taylor. He graduated from Vanderbilt University with a medical degree in 1881 and started practicing medicine. He was also a farmer. He was elected to represent Montgomery County as a Democrat in the Mississippi House of Representatives in November 1891. He served there from 1892 to 1906. He was elected to the Mississippi State Senate in 1911, representing the 26th District, which composed of Carroll and Montgomery Counties. In 1915, he was elected the state treasurer of Mississippi. He served in this position from January 17, 1916 to January 19, 1920. He died on September 5, 1930, in Winona, Mississippi.

Personal life 
Taylor was a devout Baptist. He never married. His cousin, Walter Nesbit Taylor, was also a Mississippi state senator.

References 

1855 births
1930 deaths
People from Carroll County, Mississippi
People from Winona, Mississippi
Democratic Party Mississippi state senators
Democratic Party members of the Mississippi House of Representatives
State treasurers of Mississippi
Vanderbilt University alumni